Francis McComas may refer to:

Francis McComas (painter) (1875–1938), Tasmanian-born landscape artist
J. Francis McComas (1911–1978), American science fiction editor